The Michigan Wolverines women's soccer team is the women's intercollegiate soccer program representing the University of Michigan. The school competes in the Big Ten Conference in Division I of the National Collegiate Athletic Association (NCAA). The Michigan women's soccer team plays its home games at the U-M Soccer Stadium on the university campus in Ann Arbor, Michigan. Michigan has won three Big Ten tournaments and has advanced as far as the quarterfinals in the NCAA Division I Women's Soccer Championship since the creation of the program in 1994.

History 

Women's soccer has been a varsity sport at the University of Michigan since 1994, and the team has played in the Big Ten Conference since its formation. The team has won the Big Ten conference tournament twice, in 1997 and 1999, although it has never won a regular season conference title: the best it has finished is second place, which it has done on four separate occasions. Michigan's best result in the NCAA Division I Women's Soccer Championship was a quarterfinal appearance in 2002. All of these achievements came during the tenure of Debbie Rademacher (née Belkin), who coached the team from its inception in 1994 until 2007. 

Since the 2008 season, the team has been coached by Greg Ryan, who was previously the head coach of the United States women's national soccer team. Under Ryan, the team has qualified for three berths in the NCAA Division I Women's Soccer Championship, although it has not won any Big Ten titles. On January 25, 2018, it was announced that the University of Michigan and coach Greg Ryan decided to part ways after a 6–6–6 last season, 3–5–3 in Big Ten Play. Ryan was 103–64–36 in his time at Michigan.

On February 28, 2018, Michigan hired Jennifer Klein as head coach. On September 21, 2021, Michigan announced they extended Klein's contract through the 2025 season. 

In 2021, Michigan won its 300th match as a varsity program and their third Big Ten Tournament in program history.

Coaching Staff
As of January 26, 2023

Awards and honors

Conference Awards
Big Ten Athlete of the Year
 2002: Abby Crumpton 

Big Ten Goalkeeper of the Year 
 2012: Haley Kopmeyer

Big Ten Midfielder of the Year
 2019: Sarah Stratigakis

All-Americans
 1997: Amber Berendowsk (2nd team)
 1997: Erin Gilhart (2nd team)
 2002: Abby Crumpton (2nd team)
 2002: Amy Sullivant (2nd team)
 2012: Haley Kopmeyer (2nd team)
 2013: Nkem Ezurike (1st team)
 2013: Meghan Toohey (2nd team)
 2019: Sarah Stratigakis (2nd team)
 2021: Alia Martin (1st team)

Stadium 

Michigan has played at the U-M Soccer Complex since 2008, and at the U-M Soccer Stadium (built on the site of the Soccer Complex) since 2010. The entire complex cost $6 million to build and includes three fields, including separate practice fields for both the women's and men's teams. The 2,200-seat stadium is built around the central field, and it includes stands on both sides of the field that are both covered by a roof. The stadium features a press box, separate home locker rooms for both the women's and men's teams, an athletic medicine training room, and handicap seating, as well as restrooms and concessions for spectators.

References

External links